Grugastadion was a multi-use stadium in Essen, Germany.  It was used mostly for football matches, and the stadium was able to hold 40,000 people at its height.  The stadium opened in 1963 and closed in 2001.

Defunct football venues in Germany
Defunct sports venues in Germany
Sport in Essen
Sports venues in North Rhine-Westphalia
Buildings and structures in Essen
Sports venues completed in 1963
1963 establishments in West Germany
2001 disestablishments in Germany